The Bayer designations u Herculis and U Herculis are distinct. Due to technical limitations, both designations link here. For the star
u Herculis, see 68 Herculis
U Herculis, see HD 148206

See also
 υ Herculis

Herculis, u
Hercules (constellation)